The 1986 San Marino motorcycle Grand Prix was the eleventh race of the 1986 Grand Prix motorcycle racing season. It took place on 22–24 August 1986 at the Circuito Internazionale Santa Monica.

Classification

500 cc

References

San Marino and Rimini Riviera motorcycle Grand Prix
San Marino
San Marino Motorcycle Grand Prix
San Marino Motorcycle Grand Prix